Route 105 is a north-south highway in Quebec, Canada. It runs from Hull (now part of Gatineau), where it is known as Boulevard Saint-Joseph (until the limits with Chelsea), to Grand-Remous where it ends at Route 117.

Route 105 runs mostly in the Gatineau River valley, where it is characterized by twisty and hilly sections. Besides Hull, the only other significant town along the route is Maniwaki.

Originally part of the former Route 11, it was renumbered to 105 in the 1970s, and runs parallel to Autoroute 5 in the Gatineau area.

Municipalities along Route 105

 Gatineau
 Chelsea
 La Pêche (Wakefield / Alcove / Farrellton)
 Low
 Kazabazua
 Wright
 Gracefield
 Bouchette
 Messines
 Kitigan Zibi
 Maniwaki
 Egan-Sud
 Bois-Franc
 Grand-Remous

Major intersections

See also
List of Quebec provincial highways

References

External links 

 Official Transport Quebec Road Map (Courtesy of the Quebec Ministry of Transportation) 
Route 105 on Google Maps

105